The name Eleanor has been used for three tropical cyclones in the Eastern Pacific Ocean.

Tropical Storm Eleanor (1967)
Tropical Storm Eleanor (1971)
Tropical Storm Eleanor (1975)

The name Eleanor has also been used once in the UK and Ireland's windstorm naming system.

Storm Eleanor (2018)

See also
Cyclone Elinor (1983), made landfall in Australia in March 1983

Pacific hurricane set index articles